Niamh Algar (born 28 June 1992) is an Irish actress. She is known for winning Best Actress in a Leading Role - TV Drama at the 2020 IFTA Film & Drama Awards for her performance in The Virtues. Other roles include MotherFatherSon, Raised by Wolves, and Pure. In 2021, she appeared in Wrath of Man and Censor. For her role in Calm with Horses she was nominated for the BAFTA Award for Best Actress in a Supporting Role.

Early life and education 
A native of Mullingar, Ireland, Algar is the youngest of five children. She studied design at the Dublin Institute of Technology (DIT) and graduated from the Programme of Screen Acting at the Bow Street Academy in Dublin.

Career 
Algar has appeared in films including Conor McMahon's From the Dark, Aoife Crehan's road trip film The Last Right, Lorcan Finnegan's Without Name and the Michael Fassbender-produced Calm With Horses.

On television she has appeared in Rose Cartwright's Pure, and as Tania in Desiree Akhavan's The Bisexual.

She was named amongst the 2019 BAFTAs Breakthrough Brits.

In 2019, Algar played Dinah in Shane Meadows's The Virtues with co-star Stephen Graham. for which she won Best Actress in a Leading Role - TV Drama at the 2020 IFTA Film & Drama Awards.

She has also appeared as Orla Green in MotherFatherSon in 2019 alongside Richard Gere, and as the wife of Travis Fimmel in the Ridley Scott directed American television series Raised by Wolves, and as Amber in the Channel 4 television series Pure.

Filmography

Film

Television

Awards and nominations

References

External links
 
Independent Talent profile
Bow Street Vaults – Niamh Algar
Niamh Algar - The Virtues; IFTA Winner of Best Actress Drama 2020

21st-century Irish actresses
Alumni of the Bow Street Academy
Irish film actresses
Irish television actresses
Living people
People from Mullingar
1992 births